Paul Douglas Lilly is an American judge who has been the presiding judge for the Brown County Court in Texas since January 1, 2019. Lilly has over thirty-two years of experience in the public service industry and over twenty years as an Officer, Chief of Police & Chief Executive/Director.

Early life and education
Paul Lilly was born in Fort Worth, Texas He attended college at the Texas Law Enforcement Leadership and Command College at Texas Wesleyan University, and worked night shifts as a patrol officer. He graduated in 1999. Prior to that, he received his BS in Political Science and Law from Texas Wesleyan in 1994.

Lilly completed his Master of Science in Criminal Justice (M.S.C.J.) and majored in Criminal Justice and Political Science from Texas State University in 2002. He pursued his doctorate from the University of Arizona GC and became a Doctor of Psychology (Psy.D) in Psychology, Criminology, and Justice Studies in 2014.

Career
The United States Department of Justice recruited Lilly as a part of the International Criminal Investigative Training Assistance Program (ICITAP) to travel to war-torn Bosnia-Herzegovina to assist with the investigation as well as give lectures on modern democratic policing.

In 2008, Lilly joined a team of Police Chiefs belonging to the Law Enforcement Management Institute of Texas who traveled to Italy and presented western technologies and ideologies to the Italian law enforcement community.

Lilly was selected by the United States Department of Justice to be commissioned as a Special Deputy United States Marshal. It was a supervisor position, and his job included assisting in the safety and security of the January 2009 U.S. Presidential Inauguration in Washington, D.C.

Later in 2009, Lilly retired from full-time law enforcement service. He completed his doctorate and pursued teaching at a senior university. From 2011 until 2019, Lilly served as a full-time Associate Professor of Criminal Justice at Howard Payne University as well as the Chief of Police and Director of Public Safety for the University.

Lilly was elected the Constitutional County judge of Brown County in 2018. He won by the most significant margin in county history and was sworn into office on January 1, 2019. Brownwood County webpage; brownwoodtx.com; accessed January 2023</ref>

Recognition
In 1994, Lilly was elected the Chief of Police for the Dallas area suburb of Kaufman, the youngest officer ever In this position. He implemented community-oriented policing, which launched a career specializing in this and geographic-oriented policing. Lilly was included in the American Police Hall of Fame.

Awards and honors
Lilly was awarded a Purple Heart medal for injuries he received in the line of duty, and was awarded the Distinguished Service Medal and a Congressional commendation for his community-oriented and problem-oriented policing efforts in 1998. He is the recipient of two Educational Achievement medals from the Texas Commission on Law Enforcement.  Lilly received a Medal of Valor from the city of Caldwell, Texas for his "...courage and decisiveness under fire..."

To honor his more than twenty-five years of public safety service to the State of Texas and the United States of America, Lilly was awarded the J. Edgar Hoover Gold Medal for Distinguished Public Service by the National Association of Chiefs of Police in September 2015.

Personal life
Lilly resides in Brownwood, Texas.

References

Living people
1969 births
County judges in Texas
Texas Republicans
People from Brownwood, Texas